Sheeri Rappaport (born October 27, 1977) is an American actress. She is most famous for portraying lab technician Mandy Webster on CSI: Crime Scene Investigation.

Rappaport made her television debut with a guest role on Clarissa Explains It All. She portrayed the Amazon Otere on Xena: Warrior Princess, and has also made guest appearances on 7th Heaven, The Drew Carey Show, The District and Strong Medicine. She also appeared in the films Claustrophobia, Seeing Other People, and The United States of Leland.

Apart from CSI, Rappaport also portrayed Officer Mary Franco in seasons 7 and 8 of NYPD Blue. Other roles include a manipulative Catholic schoolgirl in the 1996 teen horror film Little Witches, and as Lois Lane in the Blayne Weaver film, Losing Lois Lane.

References

External links

1977 births
American television actresses
Living people
People from Dallas
21st-century American women